Bobby Estalella may refer to:
Bobby Estalella (outfielder) (1911–1991), former Major League Baseball outfielder
Bobby Estalella (catcher) (born 1974), former Major League Baseball catcher